Maloye Ramenye is a rural locality (a village) in Beketovskoye Rural Settlement, Vozhegodsky District, Vologda Oblast, Russia. The population was 13 as of 2002.

Geography 
Maloye Ramenye is located 76 km southwest of Vozhega (the district's administrative centre) by road. Chichirino is the nearest rural locality.

References 

Rural localities in Vozhegodsky District